Bullingham is a surname, and may refer to:

 Francis Bullingham (1554–ca. 1636), English politician.
 John Bullingham (died 1598), English bishop
 Nicholas Bullingham (c. 1520–1576), English bishop

Place
Bullingham, an historic village in Herefordshire
Lower Bullingham in Herefordshire, England

See also
Herefordshire
Hereford
List of villages in Herefordshire